The Great Prince Shan is a 1924 British silent drama film directed by A.E. Coleby and featuring Sessue Hayakawa, Ivy Duke, Tsuru Aoki, Valia, David Hawthorne, Fred Raynham and Henry Vibart in important roles. The film is adapted from the 1922 novel of the same title by E. Phillips Oppenheim. It was made at Cricklewood Studios by Stoll Pictures, the largest British production company of the era. Location shooting took place on the French Riviera. It was one of two films former Hollywood star Hayakawa made for Stoll along with Sen Yan's Devotion released later the same year.

Plot
The father of a young aristocratic woman is assassinated and she is reluctant to marry a cultured, reserved and brilliant Prince Shan, graduate of Oxford and Harvard, but becomes his mistress.

Cast
 Sessue Hayakawa as Prince Shan 
 Ivy Duke as Lady Maggie Trent 
 Tsuru Aoki as Nita 
 Valia as Nadia Karetsky 
 David Hawthorne as Nigel Dorminster 
 Fred Raynham as Immelmann 
 Henry Vibart as Earl of Dorminster 
 Henry Nicholls-Bates as Gilbert Jenson 
 A.E. Coleby as Prime Minister

References

Bibliography
 Jill Nelmes. An Introduction to Film Studies. Psychology Press, 2003.

External links 
 

1924 films
1924 drama films
British drama films
Films based on British novels
English films
British silent feature films
British black-and-white films
Stoll Pictures films
Films shot at Cricklewood Studios
Films shot in France
1920s British films
Silent drama films